Get the Picture may refer to:
Get the Picture (game show), a children's game show
Get the Picture? (Smash Mouth album), 2003 
Get the Picture? (The Pretty Things album), 1965
Get the Picture: A Personal History of Photojournalism, a book by former picture editor John G. Morris